Events in the year 1979 in Greece.

Incumbents
 President – Konstantinos Tsatsos
 Prime Minister – Konstantinos Karamanlis

Events

 20 April – Maria Pangalou, rhythmic gymnast
 9 September – Vasileios Tsolakidis, artistic gymnast

References

 
Years of the 20th century in Greece
Greece
1970s in Greece
Greece